Reynolds County is a county located in the Ozark Foothills Region in the Lead Belt of Missouri. As of the 2020 census, the population was 6,096. Its county seat is Centerville. The county was officially organized on February 25, 1845, and was named in honor of former Governor of Missouri Thomas Reynolds.

The county is home to Johnson's Shut-Ins State Park, a popular tourist attraction in the state of Missouri.

History
Reynolds County was officially organized on February 25, 1845. It is still an area of rugged beauty near the geologic center of the Ozark Highland. Reynolds County was formerly part of Ripley County which was formed in 1831 and part of Wayne County which was formed in 1818. It was also previously part of Washington County and part of Ste. Genevieve County.

The Reynolds County Courthouse has burned twice. The first time was in December 1863 when the Confederate army burned it. A new courthouse was built in the fall of 1867 on the same foundation as the previous one. This courthouse was burned in late November 1871. Both times all records were destroyed. Temporary quarters again burned May 27, 1872, while a new "fireproof" courthouse was being built.

Geography

Adjacent counties
Dent County (northwest)
Iron County (northeast)
Wayne County (southeast)
Carter County (south)
Shannon County (west)

Major highways
 Route 21
 Route 49
 Route 72
 Route 106

National protected area
Mark Twain National Forest (part)

Geographical features 
Robinson Hollow

Demographics

As of the census of 2000, there were 6,689 people, 2,721 households, and 1,915 families residing in the county. The population density was 8 people per square mile (3/km2). There were 3,759 housing units at an average density of 5 per square mile (2/km2). The racial makeup of the county was 95.65% White, 0.52% Black or African American, 1.29% Native American, 0.19% Asian, 0.21% from other races, and 2.14% from two or more races. Approximately 0.82% of the population were Hispanic or Latino of any race. Among the major first ancestries reported in Reynolds County were 37.6% American, 12.1% Irish, 11.6% German, and 11.4% English.

There were 2,721 households, out of which 27.80% had children under the age of 18 living with them, 59.20% were married couples living together, 7.80% had a female householder with no husband present, and 29.60% were non-families. 26.00% of all households were made up of individuals, and 11.10% had someone living alone who was 65 years of age or older. The average household size was 2.40 and the average family size was 2.85.

In the county, the population was spread out, with 24.00% under the age of 18, 6.80% from 18 to 24, 25.00% from 25 to 44, 27.90% from 45 to 64, and 16.20% who were 65 years of age or older. The median age was 41 years. For every 100 females there were 101.60 males. For every 100 females age 18 and over, there were 98.60 males.

The median income for a household in the county was $31,546, and the median income for a family was $37,891. Males had a median income of $26,753 versus $18,322 for females. The per capita income for the county was $15,847. About 16.10% of families and 20.10% of the population were below the poverty line, including 25.90% of those under age 18 and 15.50% of those age 65 or over.

Religion
According to the Association of Religion Data Archives County Membership Report (2000), Reynolds County is a part of the Bible Belt with evangelical Protestantism being the majority religion. The most predominant denominations among residents in Reynolds County who adhere to a religion are Southern Baptists (78.80%), Baptist Missionary Association of America (8.24%), and Methodists (4.24%).

2020 Census

Politics

Local
The Democratic Party has the most elected officials at the local level in Reynolds.

State
Reynolds County is divided into two legislative districts in the Missouri House of Representatives, both of which are held by Republicans.

District 143 — Currently represented by Jeffrey Pogue (R-Salem), consists of the extreme northwestern parts of the county and includes the town of Bunker.

District 144 — Currently represented by Paul Fitzwater (R-Potosi), consists of most of the entire county and includes Ellington, Lesterville and Centerville. 

All of Reynolds County is a part of the 3rd District in the Missouri Senate and is currently represented by Gary Romine (R-Farmington).

Federal

Reynolds County is included in Missouri's 8th Congressional District and is currently represented by Jason T. Smith (R-Salem) in the U.S. House of Representatives. Smith won a special election on Tuesday, June 4, 2013, to finish out the remaining term of U.S. Representative Jo Ann Emerson (R-Cape Girardeau). Emerson announced her resignation a month after being reelected with over 70 percent of the vote in the district. She resigned to become CEO of the National Rural Electric Cooperative.

Political culture
At the presidential level, Reynolds County was a Democratic stronghold from its founding in 1845 through 1996; its only Republican votes (or indeed votes for any but the Democratic nominee) in this period were for Richard Nixon in 1960 and then again for Nixon in his 1972 landslide. In 2000, George W. Bush carried the county for the Republican Party for only the third time ever, despite his narrow national popular vote defeat that year. The county has voted Republican in every subsequent election as of 2020, with the Republican vote share declining only in 2008. The Republican vote share has not been held below 60% since 2008.

Like most rural areas throughout Southeast Missouri, voters in Reynolds County generally adhere to socially and culturally conservative principles but are more moderate or populist on economic issues, typical of the Dixiecrat philosophy. In 2004, Missourians voted on a constitutional amendment to define marriage as the union between a man and a woman—it overwhelmingly passed Reynolds County with 85.41 percent of the vote. The initiative passed the state with 71 percent of support from voters as Missouri became the first state to ban same-sex marriage. In 2006, Missourians voted on a constitutional amendment to fund and legalize embryonic stem cell research in the state—it failed in Reynolds County with 54.15 percent voting against the measure. The initiative narrowly passed the state with 51 percent of support from voters as Missouri became one of the first states in the nation to approve embryonic stem cell research. Despite Reynolds County's longstanding tradition of supporting socially conservative platforms, voters in the county have a penchant for advancing populist causes like increasing the minimum wage. In 2006, Missourians voted on a proposition (Proposition B) to increase the minimum wage in the state to $6.50 an hour—it passed Reynolds County with 77.50 percent of the vote. The proposition strongly passed every single county in Missouri with 75.94 percent voting in favor as the minimum wage was increased to $6.50 an hour in the state. During the same election, voters in five other states also strongly approved increases in the minimum wage.

Missouri presidential preference primary (2008)

In the 2008 presidential primary, voters in Reynolds County from both political parties supported candidates who finished in second place in the state at large and nationally. Former U.S. Senator Hillary Clinton (D-New York) received more votes, a total of 741, than any candidate from either party in Reynolds County during the 2008 presidential primary. She also received more votes than the total number of votes cast in the entire Republican Primary in Reynolds County.

Education
Of adults 25 years of age and older in Reynolds County, 40.4% possesses a high school diploma or higher while 10.0% holds a bachelor's degree or higher as their highest educational attainment.

Public schools
Bunker R-III School District - Bunker
Bunker Elementary School (K-06)
Bunker High School (07-12)
Centerville R-I School District - Centerville
Centerville Elementary School (K-08)
Lesterville R-IV School District - Lesterville
Lesterville Elementary School (K-06)
Lesterville High School (07-12)
Lesterville Ranch Campus (K-12) - Black
Southern Reynolds County R-II School District - Ellington
Southern Reynolds County Elementary School (PK-05)
Southern Reynolds County High School (06-12)

Public libraries
Reynolds County Library District

Communities

Cities
Bunker
Centerville (county seat)
Ellington

Unincorporated communities

 Bee Fork
 Black
 Chitwood
 Corridon
 Dagonia
 Edgehill
 Exchange
 Fruit City
 Garwood
 Greeley
 Hadley
 Lesterville
 Monterey
 Munger
 Oates
 Ohlman
 Redford
 Reynolds
 Ruble
 Smithboro
 West Fork

See also
National Register of Historic Places listings in Reynolds County, Missouri

References

External links
 Digitized 1930 Plat Book of Reynolds County  from University of Missouri Division of Special Collections, Archives, and Rare Books

 
1845 establishments in Missouri
Populated places established in 1845